This is a progressive list of men's association footballers who have held or co-held the world record for international goals, beginning with William Kenyon-Slaney, who played in England's second international scoring two goals.

Criteria
The criteria used by national FAs in considering a match as a full international were not historically fixed. Particularly for the early decades, and until more recently for FAs outside UEFA and CONMEBOL, counts of goals were often considered unreliable. RSSSF and IFFHS have spent much effort trying to produce definitive lists of full international matches, and corresponding data on players' international caps and goals. Using this data, the following records can be retrospectively produced. Note that, at the time, these records may not have been recognised.

One point of note is that early matches by the England Amateur side were played against the full national side of opponents. These matches are counted as full internationals by the IFFHS and the opposing FAs, though not by the (English) FA. This affects Vivian Woodward, who scored 29 full goals and 44 amateur goals; the IFFHS and RSSSF considers him as the record-holder from 1908.

World record

See also
 Progression of association football caps record
 List of men's footballers with 50 or more international goals

References
 Players with 100+ Caps and 30+ International Goals RSSSF

Association football record progressions